Joaddan (Yehoadan, יהועדן) or Joaddin (Yehoadin, יהועדין) according to the Qere, is a female name of Hebrew origin and a person from the Hebrew Bible. She was the mother of Amaziah, the king of Judea.

See also
Joash of Judah

References
There are two references to Joaddan in the Tanach:

He was twenty-five years old when he became king, and he reigned twenty-nine years in Jerusalem; and the name [of his] mother was Joaddan of Jerusalem. —  2 Kings 14: 2

Amaziah, twenty-five years old, became king, and reigned twenty-nine years in Jerusalem; and the name [of his] mother was Joaddan of Jerusalem. —  2 Chronicles 25: 1

Meaning
The name Joaddan means "God is bliss", but it can also be interpreted as "The Lord gives water to the earth".

Sources

Given names
9th-century BCE Hebrew people